Punia is a city in Maniema province of the Democratic Republic of the Congo. As of 2012, it had an estimated population of 19,716.

References 

Populated places in Maniema